Biswanath Basu (or sometimes Biswanath Bose) is an Indian actor who appears in Bengali films.

Filmography
Key

Films

Television
Apart from doing films, Basu has also appeared in many television serials.

References

External links

Living people
Male actors in Bengali cinema
Indian male film actors
21st-century Indian male actors
Bengali male actors
Scottish Church College alumni
Year of birth missing (living people)
Place of birth missing (living people)
People from North 24 Parganas district